The 1974 Lesser Antilles earthquake occurred at  on October 8 with a moment magnitude of 6.9 and a maximum Mercalli intensity of VIII (Severe). Four people were injured in what the United States' National Geophysical Data Center called a moderately destructive event.

Tectonic setting

While the northern and southern boundary of the Caribbean Plate are complex and diffuse, with zones of seismicity stretching several hundred kilometers across, the eastern boundary is that of the Lesser Antilles subduction zone. The largest known earthquake on the plate interface was a M7.5–8.0 event in 1843, but it did not generate a large tsunami. In opposition, the three largest events between 1950 and 1978 were intraplate normal faulting events.

See also
Lesser Antilles
List of earthquakes in 1974
List of earthquakes in the Caribbean

References

Sources

External links
Antigua & Barbuda remembers ’74 quake – The Daily Observer

1974 earthquakes
1974 in the Caribbean
Earthquakes in Antigua and Barbuda